Lisca is a Slovenian lingerie company. It was the largest such company in former Yugoslavia. Currently, it is one of the largest in Europe.

References

External links

Clothing companies of Slovenia
Slovenian brands
Clothing companies established in 1955
Sevnica
1955 establishments in Slovenia